Hakea constablei is a shrub in the Proteacea family native to eastern Australia. A bushy shrub or small tree with a profusion of white or cream flowers in spring.

Description
New growth is hairy, branches are arching hanging loosely and despite the pointed leaves not particularly prickly.
It produces cream-white flowers from September to November on the previous seasons stems.

Taxonomy and naming
Hakea constablei was initially found in 1899 but the specimen was inadvertently stored with another Hakea. It was overlooked until 1950 when  E.F. Constable collected the species near the Blue Mountains and brought it to the attention of botanists at the Sydney Herbarium. The species was first formally described by the botanist Lawrence Alexander Sidney Johnson in 1962 and published in Contributions from the New South Wales National Herbarium.
The specific epithet honours Ernie Constable a former seed and plant collector for the Royal Botanic Gardens in Sydney. He collected mostly in New South Wales, including the type specimen for the species.

Distribution and habitat
Hakea constablei is endemic to an area in the Blue Mountains and Wollondilly catchment in New South Wales where it is found among elevated sandstone outcrops as part of sclerophyll forest communities.

Conservation status
Hakea constablei is considered rare, ROTAP conservation code 2RCa, Briggs, Leigh and Hartley 1996.

References

constablei
Flora of New South Wales
Plants described in 1962